Downingtown station is a commuter and intercity passenger rail station located in the western suburbs of Philadelphia at West Lancaster Avenue & Stuart Avenue in Downingtown, Pennsylvania. It is served by most Amtrak Keystone Service and SEPTA Paoli/Thorndale Line trains. Amtrak's Pennsylvanian does not stop here. In 2017, the average total SEPTA weekday boardings at this station was 291, and the average total SEPTA weekday alightings was 312.

History

The original Downingtown station was built in the 19th century by the Pennsylvania Railroad, and was destroyed by fire in the early morning of February 24, 1992. The foundation from the old station can still be seen today.

Replacement station
The Pennsylvania state department of transportation has proposed building a new train station for Downington "at about a quarter mile south of Lancaster Avenue on Brandywine Avenue/US 322" starting in 2025.

Station layout
There is no ticket office at this station. There are 360 parking spaces for daily parking at the station–223 spaces are owned by SEPTA, and the remaining are part of an adjacent municipal lot. This is 32.8 track miles from Philadelphia's Suburban Station. Downingtown is the westernmost Amtrak station on the Keystone Corridor that is also served by SEPTA's Paoli/Thorndale service. Additionally, the SEPTA Route 135 bus serves the station.

Downingtown has two low-level side platforms. A center track is not used for passenger service.

Gallery

References

External links 

SEPTA – Downingtown Station

Downingtown Amtrak-SEPTA Station (USA RailGuide – Train Web)
Images of the Old Downingtown station, south side c.1900

SEPTA Regional Rail stations
Philadelphia to Harrisburg Main Line
Amtrak stations in Pennsylvania
Railway stations in Chester County, Pennsylvania